The Rappbode is a right-hand, southwestern tributary of the River Bode in the Harz mountains in the German state of Saxony-Anhalt. In its lower reaches it is impounded by the Rappbode Dam, the largest dam in the Harz.

The Rappbode rises east of the B 4 federal road near the Jägerfleck at the junction of the three federal states of Lower Saxony, Saxony-Anhalt and Thuringia. On the opposite side of the B 4 there are numerous source streams of the river Zorge. The Rappbode flows in a mainly northeastern direction through the villages of Benneckenstein and Trautenstein, before it enters the Rappbode Auxiliary Dam and, shortly thereafter, the Rappbode Dam itself. It is united with the Bode further downstream at the Wendefurth Dam downstream.

See also
List of rivers of Saxony-Anhalt

Rivers of Saxony-Anhalt
Rivers of the Harz
Rivers of Germany